American rapper Jidenna has released two studio albums, two extended plays (EPs), and twelve singles.

Studio albums

Extended plays

Singles

As lead artist

Music videos

Notes

References

External links
 

Discographies of American artists
Hip hop discographies